Duane Paul Kale  (born 1 September 1967) is a New Zealand Paralympic swimmer who won four gold medals, along with a silver and a bronze, at the 1996 Summer Paralympics. He was also the Chef de Mission for the New Zealand Paralympic Team at the 2008 and 2012 Summer Paralympics.

In the 1997 New Year Honours, Kale was appointed an Officer of the New Zealand Order of Merit, for services to swimming. In November 2013, he was elected to the International Paralympic Committee Governing Board.

References

External links 
 
 

1967 births
Living people
New Zealand male freestyle swimmers
New Zealand referees and umpires
Paralympic swimmers of New Zealand
Paralympic gold medalists for New Zealand
Paralympic silver medalists for New Zealand
Paralympic bronze medalists for New Zealand
Paralympic medalists in swimming
Swimmers at the 1996 Summer Paralympics
Medalists at the 1996 Summer Paralympics
Officers of the New Zealand Order of Merit
International Paralympic Committee members
S6-classified Paralympic swimmers
20th-century New Zealand people
New Zealand male butterfly swimmers
New Zealand male medley swimmers
New Zealand male backstroke swimmers